is a Japanese taekwondo competitor. Competing in the 49 kg category she won a bronze medal at the 2018 Asian Games and placed fifth in 2014.

Her elder brother Yuma Yamada won a bronze medal in taekwondo at the 2014 Asian Games.

References

1993 births
Living people
People from Seto, Aichi
Japanese female taekwondo practitioners
Sportspeople from Aichi Prefecture
Asian Games medalists in taekwondo
Taekwondo practitioners at the 2014 Asian Games
Medalists at the 2018 Asian Games
Asian Games bronze medalists for Japan
Taekwondo practitioners at the 2018 Asian Games
Taekwondo practitioners at the 2020 Summer Olympics
Olympic taekwondo practitioners of Japan
21st-century Japanese women